Godstow Bridge is a road bridge across the River Thames in England at Godstow near Oxford. The bridge is just upstream of Godstow Lock on the reach to King's Lock and carries a minor road between Wolvercote and Wytham.

The bridge is in two parts. The older part crosses the original course of the river and weir stream near The Trout Inn, a well-known public house. This stone bridge was in existence in 1692 and was probably the one held by the Royalists against Parliamentarians in 1645, during the English Civil War. It has two arches, one being pointed and the other rounded. The newer part was built across the new lock cut in 1792. This has two round arches of brick and was rebuilt in 1892. The North arch dates from medieval times. The Bridge is a Grade II Listed Building.

The importance of the bridge was reduced by the construction of the Oxford By-pass and the A34 Bridge a short distance upstream.

See also
Crossings of the River Thames

References

Bridges across the River Thames
Bridges in Oxfordshire
Grade II listed buildings in Oxfordshire
Bridges completed in the 17th century
Bridges completed in 1792
Bridges completed in 1892
Grade II listed bridges